Diana Bartovičová (born 20 May 1993) is a Slovak football midfielder currently playing for Slavia Praha in the Czech First Division. She is a member of the Slovak national team.

References

1993 births
Living people
Slovak women's footballers
Expatriate women's footballers in the Czech Republic
Sportspeople from Trenčín
1. FC Slovácko players
Slovak expatriate footballers
Slovak expatriate sportspeople in the Czech Republic
Slovakia women's international footballers
Women's association football midfielders
FIFA Century Club
SK Slavia Praha (women) players
Czech Women's First League players